Shri Jagannath temple(Odia: ଶ୍ରୀ ଜଗନ୍ନାଥ ମନ୍ଦିର) (popularly known as "Shabara Shrikshetra") is a temple located in Koraput, Odisha, India. It is not only built as an altar for worship, but also as a multipurpose area for Jagannath consciousness. Jagannath consciousness is the main theme of Jagannath which can not be confined within the limits of a traditional religious theological order, because it is a cult (or even a philosophical system).

It is originated from the tribal culture, and it has no antagonism towards any religion, caste or creed, Practice of tolerance in the real life of the individual and the society wedded to this ideal, is one piece used in the cult. This is practiced at Shabara Shrikshetra in letter and spirit. Everybody has free access to this shrine, which virtually demonstrates the very concept of Jagannath consciousness having tribal bias.

See also
Jagannath
Patali Srikhetra
Ratha Yatra
Ananta Vasudeva Temple
Baladevjew Temple
Devadasi
Juggernaut

Gallery

References

External links

 Temples of Orissa
 Jagannath Ratha-Yatra & The Story of Lord Jagannath (Veda encyclopedia)
 Odissi Sri Jagannath  (odissi.com)

 

Religious organizations established in 1972
Krishna
12th-century Hindu temples
Hindu temples in Koraput district
Temples dedicated to Jagannath